Dresden is a city in Decatur County, Kansas, United States.  As of the 2020 census, the population of the city was 43.

History
Dresden was founded in 1888. It was named by German settlers after the city of Dresden, Germany.

The first post office in Dresden was established in October 1888.

Dresden was a station on the Chicago, Rock Island and Pacific Railroad.

Geography
Dresden is located at  (39.622221, -100.421403).

Demographics

2010 census
As of the census of 2010, there were 41 people, 19 households, and 12 families living in the city. The racial makeup of the city was 100.0% White.

There were 19 households, of which 21.1% had children under the age of 18 living with them, 57.9% were married couples living together, 5.3% had a male householder with no wife present, and 36.8% were non-families. 31.6% of all households were made up of individuals, and 15.8% had someone living alone who was 65 years of age or older. The average household size was 2.16 and the average family size was 2.75.

The median age in the city was 49.8 years. 22% of residents were under the age of 18; 0.0% were between the ages of 18 and 24; 19.5% were from 25 to 44; 24.4% were from 45 to 64; and 34.1% were 65 years of age or older. The gender makeup of the city was 51.2% male and 48.8% female.

2000 census
As of the census of 2000, there were 51 people, 23 households, and 16 families living in the city. The racial makeup of the city was 100.00% White.

There were 23 households, out of which 17.4% had children under the age of 18 living with them, 73.9% were married couples living together, and 26.1% were non-families. 26.1% of all households were made up of individuals, and 4.3% had someone living alone who was 65 years of age or older. The average household size was 2.22 and the average family size was 2.65.

In the city, the population was spread out, with 19.6% under the age of 18, 2.0% from 18 to 24, 25.5% from 25 to 44, 23.5% from 45 to 64, and 29.4% who were 65 years of age or older. The median age was 50 years. For every 100 females, there were 121.7 males. For every 100 females age 18 and over, there were 115.8 males.

The median income for a household in the city was $24,375, and the median income for a family was $31,500. Males had a median income of $12,500 versus $11,250 for females. The per capita income for the city was $17,236. None of the population and none of the families were below the poverty line.

Education
North of highway 383 is served by Oberlin USD 294 public school district, South of the highway is served by Hoxie USD 412.

References

Further reading

External links
 Dresden - Directory of Public Officials
 Dresden city map, KDOT

Cities in Kansas
Cities in Decatur County, Kansas